Diceratura amaranthica is a species of moth of the family Tortricidae. It is found in France and Spain and on Corsica.

The wingspan is 9–12 mm. Adults are on wing from May to June and in September.

References

Moths described in 1963
Cochylini